Watnall  is an area in the Borough of Broxtowe in Nottinghamshire, England. It is part of Greasley civil parish, and is located one mile north of Kimberley. It is in the Nuthall West and Greasley (Watnall) ward of Broxtowe Council.  The village is barely separated from Nuthall. Watnall Hall was built c. 1690 and demolished in 1962. Today, only the gate piers, fragments of the stone boundary wall and lodge remain on Main Road. Its owners included Launcelot Rolleston in the 18th century.
Even though only a village, Watnall is home to many businesses and organisations, such as British Bakeries and the Nottingham meteorological centre.  There are three World War II bunkers in Watnall that served as Royal Air Force Fighter Command for the Midlands.

Further reading

References 

Villages in Nottinghamshire
Places in the Borough of Broxtowe